According to Lounge, the Yoruba language has a rather elaborate vigesimal (base-20) numeral system that involves both addition and subtraction and multiplication.

The base of the counting system is ogún 'twenty' (or 'score'). There are words for each of the decades; units in 1–4 are created by adding to these, while units in 5–9 are created by subtracting from the next decade. The odd decades are created by subtracting ten from the next even decade, as in Danish. Multiples are also very important in the numerical system for example the number 60 is ọgọ́ta which literally means three twenties (ogún = 20, ẹ̀ta = 3). 

Up to 30, Yoruba has distinct forms of the numerals for counting objects, which derive from counting cowries. 

* Oókàn is a contraction of owó ọ̀kan 'one cowrie'; 2–10, 20, and 30 are analogous.
** Lá is a contraction of lé ẹ̀wá 'and ten'.
*** Ẹ̀ẹ́dógún is a contraction of aárùn-ún-dí(n)(l)ógún 'five from twenty'.
*** igbéo is a contraction of igba owó 'a heap of cowries'.

Ogún is the basic word for twenty, okòó the word when counting objects. For thirty, the forms are ọgbọ̀n and ọɡbọ̀n ǒ. Units apart from the fives are generally transparent: oókànlélógún 'twenty-one', eéjìdínlọ́ɡbọ̀n 'twenty-eight', etc. There are also more recent decimal forms for the thousands: 2,000 ẹgbẹ̀rún méjì 'thousand twice', 3,000 ẹgbẹ̀rún mẹ́ta 'thousand thrice', etc., as well as additive forms for the fives, due to the influence of English. Numbers higher than 20,000 also tend to be transparent: 40,000 is ẹgbàawàá lọ́nà méjì '20,000 two times'.

Notes

References 

Esiri, Ejiro. (2011). Numeral System of Yoruba: Focus on the Dialect of Oyo B.A Dissertation.
Lounge, Olu. (2009). "A Vigesimal Number System".BookBuilders
Lounge, Olu. (2009). "A Decimal Number System". BookBuilders

Yoruba language
Numerals